Alexander de Brus (c. 1285 – 17 February 1307), Dean of Glasgow, was a younger brother of King Robert I of Scotland, who supported his brother in the struggle for the crown of Scotland. He was captured by forces at Loch Ryan, Galloway, Scotland and later executed by the English.

Born c. 1285 at Carrick, Ayrshire, Scotland he was the fourth son of Robert de Brus, 6th Lord of Annandale and Margaret, Countess of Carrick. He is said to have been a learned man who was educated at Cambridge and was later named Dean of Glasgow. 
On 9 February 1307 shortly after King Robert returned to the Isle of Arran from Rathlin Island, Alexander, his brother Thomas de Brus and Sir Reginald Crawford, sailing 18 galleys, landed with a force of some 1000 Irishmen at Loch Ryan. They were met by a force of Gallowaymen led by Dungal MacDouall, who was a supporter of the Comyns. Their force was overwhelmed in the ensuing battle and all three leaders were captured, badly wounded. All three were hanged, drawn and beheaded a few days later at Carlisle, Cumberland, England.

References

1285 births
1307 deaths
Alexander de Brus
People of the Wars of Scottish Independence